Andreas Eriksson is a Swedish contemporary visual artist. He is living in Medelplana, Sweden.

Biography 
Eriksson was born 1975 in Björsäter, Västergötland, Sweden.

Eriksson works mainly with painting, inspired by the nature around his studio. He also works with sculpture, photography and weaving. Eriksson represented Sweden at the 2011 Venice Bienniale. Eriksson had a major solo exhibition in 2020 titled From Sketch to Tapestry at Nordic Watercolour Museum on the island of Tjörn in Sweden.

References 

1975 births
Living people
Swedish contemporary artists
Swedish painters